Microula is a genus of flowering plants belonging to the family Boraginaceae.

Its native range is Himalaya to China.

Species:

Microula bhutanica 
Microula blepharolepis 
Microula ciliaris 
Microula diffusa 
Microula efoveolata 
Microula filicaulis 
Microula floribunda 
Microula forrestii 
Microula galactantha 
Microula hispidissima 
Microula involucriformis 
Microula jilongensis 
Microula leiocarpa 
Microula leucantha 
Microula longipes 
Microula longituba 
Microula muliensis 
Microula mustangensis 
Microula myosotidea 
Microula oblongifolia 
Microula ovalifolia 
Microula pentagona 
Microula polygonoides 
Microula pseudotrichocarpa 
Microula pustulosa 
Microula rockii 
Microula roseiflora 
Microula sikkimensis 
Microula spathulata 
Microula stenophylla 
Microula tangutica 
Microula tibetica 
Microula trichocarpa 
Microula turbinata 
Microula younghusbandii

References

Boraginoideae
Boraginaceae genera